Cyclobacteriaceae is a family of bacteria in the phylum Bacteroidota.

References

Cytophagia
Bacteria families
Gram-negative bacteria